Bogojevo is a village located in Odžaci municipality, West Bačka District, Serbia. The village has an ethnic Hungarian majority and its population numbering 1,744 people (as of 2011 census).

History
Baden culture graves and ceramics (bowls, anthropomorphic urns) were found in the town.

Gallery

Population

1961: 3,037
1971: 2,874
1981: 2,557
1991: 2,301

Ethnic groups (2002 census)

Hungarians = 1,154 (54.43%)
Romani = 374 (17.64%)
Serbs = 287 (13.54%)
Romanians = 163 (7.69%)
others.

See also
List of places in Serbia
List of cities, towns and villages in Vojvodina

References

 Slobodan Ćurčić, Broj stanovnika Vojvodine, Novi Sad, 1996.

External links 

 History of Bogojevo
 www.hhrf.org/gombos/
 www.gombos.doroszlo.net
 www.gombos.ini.hu

Places in Bačka
West Bačka District
Odžaci